The Soundtrack of My Life is the 18th studio album released by Donny Osmond in 2014. It contains his versions of very popular songs from when he was growing up, like "Ben", "My Cherie Amour", and "Baby Love". The album peaked at No. 181 on the Billboard 200 chart and No. 17 on the UK Albums Chart.  It featured Stevie Wonder and Laura Wright.

Track listing

Charts

Donny Osmond albums
Decca Records albums
2014 albums
Covers albums